My Healing Love is a 2018 South Korea drama television series, starring So Yoo-jin, Yeon Jung-hoon and Yoon Jong-hoon. It aired on MBC from 14 October 2018 to 3 March 2019 on Sunday at 20:45. It was the station's last Sunday evening drama as the time slot was abolished due to budget cuts.

Plot
Im Chi-woo (So Yoo-jin) is someone who always bravely faces challenges that are thrown in her life.

Cast

Main
So Yoo-jin as Im Chi-woo / Choi Chi-yoo
Yeon Jung-hoon as Choi Jin-yoo
Yoon Jong-hoon as Park Wan-seung

Supporting
Hwang Young-hee as Lee Sam-sook, Chi-woo's stepmother
Lee Do-gyeom as Im Joo-chul
Kwon So-hyun as Im Joo-ah
Shorry J as Song Jae-young
Ban Hyo-jung as Jung Hyo-sil
Kil Yong-woo as Choi Jae-hak
Im Kang-sung as Park Jun-seung
Jung Ae-ri as Heo Song-joo
Kang Da-hyun as Choi Yi-yoo
Kim Chang-wan as Park Boo-han
So Joo-yeon as Yang Eun-joo
Park Joon-geum as Kim I-bok, Won-seung and Jeon-seung's mother, Chi-woo's mother-in-law

Awards and nominations

References

External links
 
My Healing Love at MBC Global Media

MBC TV television dramas
2018 South Korean television series debuts
2019 South Korean television series endings
Korean-language television shows
Television series by Chorokbaem Media
Television series by Kim Jong-hak Production